Salameh is a colloquial variant on the classical Arabic Salamah.

Salameh may refer to:

People

Patronym
 Amram ibn Salameh ibn Ghazal ha-Kohen ha-Levi, a Samaritan liturgical poet of late antiquity

Given name
 Salameh Hammad (born 1944), Jordanian politician
 Salameh Nematt (born 1962), Jordanian journalist and analyst

Surname

 Ali Hassan Salameh (1940–1979), Palestinian chief of operations for the Black September organization
 Dalal Salameh (born 1965), Palestinian activist and former politician
 Hamzeh Salameh (born 1986), Lebanese footballer 
 Hasan Salama or Hassan Salameh (1912–1948), Palestinian fighter
 Ibrahim Salameh (born 1945), Syrian Greek Catholic born Christian cleric, Apostolic Exarch of the Melkite Greek Catholic Apostolic Exarchate of Argentina
 Jamal Salameh (1945–2021), Egyptian songwriter and melodist
 Mohammed A. Salameh (born 1967), Palestinian perpetrator of the 1993 World Trade Center Bombing
 Mostafa Salameh (born 1970), Jordanian mountaineer 
 Nadine Salameh (born 1979), Palestinian actress
 Nabil Salameh (born 1962), Palestinian singer, musician and songwriter
 Patrick Salameh (born 1957), known as The Marseille Ripper, French criminal and serial killer
 Ranin Salameh (born 1996), Arab-Israeli footballer 
 Riad Salameh (born 1950), governor of the Banque du Liban
 Samir Salameh (1944–2018), Palestinian-French visual artist

Places
 Al-Salameh, Syria, a village in northern Aleppo Governorate, northwestern Syria
 Salameh-ye Sofla, village in Khuzestan Province, Iran
 Salameh-ye Vosta, village in Khuzestan Province, Iran

See also
Salama (disambiguation) / also Salamah (disambiguation)
Salami (disambiguation)
Salameh (disambiguation)
Salamé (disambiguation)